Richard Klinkhamer (15 March 1937 – January 2016) was a Dutch murderer, who went on to write a book about how he could have committed the crime. In 2000, he was sentenced to seven years in prison for manslaughter after killing his wife and hiding her body.

Murder conviction

In 1991 Klinkhamer's wife, Hannelore (née Godfrinon), went missing from their home in Hongerige Wolf. A year later Klinkhamer went to his publisher with the manuscript for Woensdag Gehaktdag, which detailed seven ways in which he could have killed his wife. The manuscript in question was rejected by his publisher, Willem Donker, as being "too gruesome". Klinkhamer became the primary suspect in the police investigation for the disappearance of Hannelore: he was questioned several times and detained once. Nevertheless, the investigation yielded no concrete evidence against the writer.

In 1997 Klinkhamer sold the residence he had shared with his wife and moved to Amsterdam. In 2000 the new occupants of Klinkhamer's former home started renovation on the garden, and work crews discovered the skeletal remains of his wife in clay beneath a concrete floor in the garden shed. Shortly thereafter he was arrested and charged with his wife's murder, to which he confessed. In 2001 Klinkhamer was sentenced to seven years in prison. He was released from prison in 2003 for good behavior. Klinkhamer died in January 2016, aged 78.

Bibliography 
 (1983) Gehoorzaam als een hond 
 (1983) De hotelrat en andere verhalen 
 (1993) Losgeld 
 (1996) Kruis of munt 
 (2007) Woensdag Gehaktdag

References

Further reading 
 Meijer, Martijn (2004) Klinkhamer: een leven tussen woord en moord

External links 
An article by Laura Martz about Klinkhamer and his work on Salon.com

1937 births
2016 deaths
20th-century Dutch criminals
20th-century Dutch novelists
20th-century Dutch male writers
21st-century Dutch criminals
21st-century Dutch novelists
21st-century Dutch male writers
Dutch male novelists
Dutch people convicted of manslaughter
Prisoners and detainees of the Netherlands
Writers from Amsterdam
Scandals in the Netherlands
Controversies in the Netherlands
Literature controversies